The Cavan Echo is a newspaper based on College Street in the Irish town of Cavan, and has currently a circulation of 17,500 that serves all of County Cavan. The Cavan Echo is the only Irish-owned paper in County Cavan. It covers news, sport, entertainments, features and community news. It is tabloid in format, but not in style and is a free newspaper. Its sister paper, Monaghan Echo, began on 16 February 2007.

Sources
 Cavan Echo owners look to expand
 Cavan Echo launch

External links

Echo
Mass media in County Cavan
Newspapers published in the Republic of Ireland